The 2017 FIA World Rally Championship-2 is the fifth season of the World Rally Championship-2, an auto racing championship recognised by the Fédération Internationale de l'Automobile, running in support of the World Rally Championship. It was created when the Group R class of rally car was introduced in 2013. The Championship is open to cars complying with R4, R5, and Super 2000 regulations. Esapekka Lappi did not return to defend his 2016 title as left Škoda Motorsport for the top WRC category to become third driver of Toyota GAZOO Racing. However Škoda Motorsport retained the title thanks to Pontus Tidemand who won the championship after Rallye Deutschland.

Calendar

Teams and drivers

Regulation changes

Sporting regulations
 The format of the series will change to include three events nominated by the FIA that will be compulsory for all crews competing for points. This represents a change from previous years, where competitors were free to enter as many rounds of the championship as they wished, nominating individual rounds to count as their points-scoring events. The change was introduced to address concerns over the potential for an anticlimactic championship, where the championship could be resolved without the leading crews directly competing against one another. The Rallies of Portugal, Germany and Great Britain are the compulsory events for 2017.

Season report

The championship started with Andreas Mikkelsen, in a one-off outing with Škoda Motorsport after losing his WRC drive because of the Volkswagen Motorsport withdrawal from the sport, winning the Rallye Automobile Monte-Carlo by more than 3 minutes from teammate Jan Kopecký. Mikkelsen won 10 out of 15 stages, and led from start to end. The podium was completed by Monte veteran and previous winner Bryan Bouffier. Eric Camilli finished fourth in his first outing with the M-Sport World Rally Team after being demoted from the team's WRC drivers line up.

Ole Christian Veiby was the early leader of the Rally Sweden, winning the first two stages of the rally, but a push by Pontus Tidemand in which he won five of the remaining six stages of the leg 1, made him the Leader of the rally, a position he would maintain for the rest of the legs. Tidemand's victory give Škoda Motorsport the second victory of the season in a row. The Podium was completed by M-Sport World Rally Team's Teemu Suninen and Veiby.

Rally Mexico was a two-way fight between Camilli and Tidemand. By the end of Leg 2, Tidemand was on top by just 2 seconds. Nevertheless, Camilli choose wet tires for the last leg, and could not match the times of Tidemand, thus the Sweden won his second rally in a row, and give Škoda Motorsport the third out of three win in the season. The podium was completed by local and former Production World Rally Champion Benito Guerra.

Andreas Mikkelsen returned to the Škoda Motorsport's team for the Tour de Corse, and dominated the event, leading from start to finish. Teemu Suninen finished second, taking the position after his teammate Eric Camilli hit trouble in the first leg. The podium was completed by local Yohan Rossel. Mikkelsen's win was his second in as many outings.

Pontus Tidemand won the Rally Argentina by more than 10 minutes from local Juan Carlos Alonso to continue  Škoda Motorsport's winning streak. Tidemand found a trouble-free weekend in one of the roughest events of the year were only five WRC-2 Crews finished the event. Benito Guerra completed the podium.

Mikkelsen returned for the Rally de Portugal and looked set to take another dominant win, only to roll his car on the very last stage of the rally whilst holding a 3 minute lead. This subsequently handed Tidemand his fourth win from six rallies, with the podium being completed by Teemu Suninen and reigning Junior WRC champion Simone Tempestini.

Results and standings

Season summary

FIA World Rally Championship-2 for Drivers

Points are awarded to the top ten classified finishers.

FIA World Rally Championship-2 for Co-Drivers

FIA World Rally Championship-2 for Teams

Notes

References

External links
Official website of the World Rally Championship
Official website of the Fédération Internationale de l'Automobile

 
World Rally Championship-2